Send One Your Love is the twelfth studio album by jazz saxophonist Boney James, released in 2009.

The cover of James Taylor's "Don't Let Me Be Lonely Tonight", featuring guest vocalist Quinn, was the only non-instrumental track on the album. It was released as a single, and was nominated for the Grammy Award for Best Traditional R&B Performance in 2010.

Track listing

Personnel 
 Boney James – arrangements, tenor saxophone (1, 3-6, 9, 10), soprano saxophone (2), keyboards (4, 9), programming (4, 5, 6), alto saxophone (7, 8)
 Tim Carmon – keyboards (1-8, 10), arrangements (2, 7, 10), keyboard bass (5, 7, 10)
 Mark Ellis Stephens – keyboards (9), keyboard bass (9)
 Dean Parks – guitars (2, 4, 8)
 Rob Bacon – guitars (3, 5, 10)
 Agape – guitars (6)
 Alex Al – bass (1-4, 6, 8)
 Lil' John Roberts – drums (1, 2, 8), cymbals (4)
 Teddy Campbell – drums (3, 7, 9, 10), cymbals (6)
 Lenny Castro – percussion (1-4, 6-10)
 Stefan Harris – vibraphone (8)
 Sue Ann Carwell – vocals (1)
 Kimberly Brewer – vocals (2, 10)
 Lynne Fiddmont – vocals (2, 10)
 Kenya Hathaway – vocals (2, 10)
 Lamont Van Hook – vocals (3, 10)
 Lily Mariye – touch (4)
 Quinn – vocals (5)

String section (Tracks 2, 6, 7 & 8)
 Jerry Hey – arrangements 
 Ralph Morrison – concertmaster
 Stephen Erdody, Paula Hochhalter, Christina Soule and Cecilia Tsan – cello 
 Marlow Fisher, Roland Kato, Shawn Mann and Victoria Miskolczy – viola 
 Nina Evluhov, Julie Gigante, Henry Gronnier, Alan Grunfeld, Tamara Hatwan, Aimee Kreston, Ralph Morrison, Sara Parkins, Katia Popov, Tereza Stanislav, Sarah Thornblade and Josefina Vergara – violin

Production 
 Boney James – producer, recording 
 Isaiah Abolin – recording 
 Dave Rideau – recording 
 Bill Schnee – recording, mixing
 Cliff Allen – assistant engineer 
 Darius Fong – assistant engineer 
 Steve Genewick – assistant engineer 
 Eric Rennaker – assistant engineer 
 Paul Smith – assistant engineer 
 Sangwook "Sunny" Nam – mastering 
 Lexy Shroyer – production coordinator 
 Gravillias, Inc. – art direction, design 
 Harper Smith – photography 
 Annie Wolfson – grooming 
 Melissa Orndorff – stylist 
 Direct Management Group, Inc. – management 

Studios
 Recorded at The Backyard and Westlake Studios (Los Angeles, California); Capitol Studios and Sunset Sound (Hollywood, California); Schnee Studios (North Hollywood, California); Legacy Recording Studios (New York City, New York).
 Mixed at Schnee Studios
 Mastered at The Mastering Lab (Ojai, California).

References

AllMusic overview

2009 albums
Boney James albums
Concord Records albums